Hvaldimir is a male beluga whale that fishermen near Hammerfest in northern Norway noticed in April 2019 wearing a camera harness. After being freed from the harness, the whale remained in the area and appeared used to humans. Speculation that he had been trained by Russia as a spy whale led to his being dubbed Hvaldimir, a pun on the Norwegian  (whale) and Vladimir Putin.

Appearances and reactions

The whale appeared beginning on 26 April 2019 north of Hammerfest, off the island of Ingøya and near the village of Tufjord on the island of Rolvsøya, wearing a tight-fitting camera harness labelled "Equipment St. Petersburg", and rubbing against boats in apparent attempts to free himself. Animal rescue staff and fishers worked to free him from the harness. A fisherman named Joar Hesten finally put on a survival suit and jumped over the side of the boat to loosen the harness buckles. The whale continued to return to the boats for several days, asking for food and playing fetch, and has shown himself to be very tame, coming when called and liking to be scratched around the blowhole. He later followed a boat to Hammerfest harbour.

The Norwegian Directorate of Fisheries and the police urged the public not to feed the whale and to leave him alone to avoid stressing him. There was concern he might become aggressive or might  become too dependent on humans, like Keiko the orca. A proposal was made to place the whale in a sanctuary in Iceland which already houses two belugas from China, but since he seemed to be making efforts to find his own food, the Directorate of Fisheries decided in mid-May not to relocate him. The Norwegian Institute of Marine Research recommended returning him to a facility in Russia if he did not become self-sustaining. However, it became apparent a few days later that the whale was malnourished, and with Hammerfest Municipality taking responsibility, the Directorate of Fisheries agreed that he should be fed, and Norwegian Orca Survey began doing so, although there was hope that the feeding could eventually end. People donated funds to feed him. He was later reported to have been seriously ill, and to have been hooked by an angler and injured. Norwegian Orca Survey's two main staff at the time included a former employee of Marineland  and a career whale trainer from SeaWorld and Marineland. The trainers found that the whale responded to hand gestures, demonstrating that he had received prior training. The trainers began to utilize Hvaldimir's trained behaviors to perform daily "feeding shows" in Hammerfest Harbor to cruise boat passengers.  The trainers taught Hvaldimir to lie alongside a boat so that he could be medically treated if necessary, although Norway has never permitted any veterinary care of Hvaldimir.

After attracting crowds of observers, the whale left Hammerfest harbour in July and apparently had learned to find food; he was observed several times in August near Seiland, an island located between Hammerfest and Alta. He then appeared in early September in the harbour at Alta, where he showed signs of injury from propellers and people were observed throwing things at him and pushing things into his mouth.

Protection efforts
Regina Crosby, an American filmmaker based in Oslo, Norway, began filming a documentary about Hvaldimir in July of 2019. During filming, Crosby documented  that Hvaldimir was continuing to be dependent on humans for socialization, putting his life at risk. In the fall of 2019, Crosby founded OneWhale, a non-profit organization dedicated to the protection of Hvaldimir. OneWhale formed team of scientists, veterinarians and whale experts to advise on how best to give Hvaldimir a future as a wild whale. OneWhale has campaigned against putting Hvaldimir back into a tank, and campaigned to ensure the Norwegian authorities do not euthanize the whale. By summer of 2020 Hvaldimir's problems with human interactions continued to mount. He lived full time at industrial salmon farms in the Norwegian fjords, and was often an unwelcome nuisance in that environment. At the same time, Hvaldimir's international fame was increasing, and OneWhale regularly recorded as many 300 tourists a day visiting him the summer.  

By summer of 2021, OneWhale formed "Team Hvaldimir" in an effort to mitigate the challenges and tourism around the whale. Team Hvaldimir is a group of trained scientists and volunteers who live on site around the whale at all times. In fall of 2021, OneWhale partnered with NOAH, the foremost animal rights organization in Norway. Together they are working with the authorities in Norway to advocate for Hvaldimir's safety and future, seeking a long term care and protection plan. OneWhale is also working closely with the city of Hammerfest to dedicate a fjord as a protected marine reserve for Hvaldimir. Many studies show that if trained cetaceans are given a period of time away from people they may eventually unlearn their habits toward humans. OneWhale, NOAH and Hammerfest are working together to create the Norwegian Whale Reserve, which would hopefully provide a home for Hvaldimir, and a home to formerly captive belugas and orcas around the world.

Hvaldimir's current life
The Directorate of Fisheries and Mattilsynet, the Norwegian agencies governing Hvaldimir's future, have repeatedly issued conflicting statements about Hvaldimir's welfare, at times claiming he had become a wild whale. But as of January 2023, Hvaldimir is still living full time at fish farms off the coast of Norway and interacting with workers, fishermen and tourists. No agency within the Norwegian government has provided any protection or animal welfare care for Hvaldimir.

Interactions with people
On 4 May 2019, after a day in Hammerfest, two friends went to the docks to look for the whale; 25-year-old Ina Mansika's iPhone fell out of her pocket into the water and the whale brought it back to her. A video posted on Instagram shows her then scratching him under the chin.

In June 2019, he pulled a diver's knife from its scabbard, and played with an underwater drone that was being tested. On 9 September, he was filmed taking a kayaker’s GoPro camera, then retrieving it from the harbour floor to return it to its owner, while earlier that month he was observed playing with a wild herring gull, teasing it into dropping fish it had caught.

In November 2019, a video appeared online of a beluga playing fetch with a rugby ball off the Norwegian coast; this has been confirmed to be Hvaldimir.

Theories and naming
Upon removing the harness, the buckle clip read "St. Petersburg". This harness and camera led to suspicion that the whale had been trained for use in Russian espionage. Both the United States and Russia are known to have military cetacean training programs, with Russian programs incorporating beluga whales. (See also: Military marine mammal.) A Russian marine scientist told a Norwegian colleague that the harness was not of a type used by Russian scientists. A Russian military spokesman, Colonel Viktor Baranets, said in response: "If we were using this animal for spying do you think we would attach a mobile phone number with the message 'please call this number'?", but did not deny that the whale might have escaped from the Russian Navy; the Russian naval base at Murmansk is not far away. The Norwegian Police Security Service is investigating. A Russian naval analyst, Mikhail Barabanov, said he thought the whale was part of a zoological tracking project. In late May 2019 satellite photos surfaced reportedly showing pens at the Russian base at Olenya Guba that could accommodate belugas and other cetaceans.

Because of the Russian espionage theory, the newspaper Verdens Gang dubbed the whale Hvaldimir, a play on the first name of the Russian President, Vladimir Putin, and the Norwegian hval, whale; on 3 May the national broadcaster NRK announced that this was the winner of their public vote to name the whale, with "Joar", for the fisherman, polling second and "Agent James Beluga" third.

Morten Vikeby, a former Norwegian consul in Murmansk, has suggested that Hvaldimir is a therapy animal from a programme for disabled children at the Arctic Circle Padi Dive Centre and Lodge, near the Russian–Norwegian border; specifically, he may be Semyon, who was placed with the centre while still young after being attacked by sea lions and was featured in an article Vikeby wrote about the institution in 2008 for the magazine Fiskeribladet. The harness would be for the purpose of towing a boat with children inside. That institution no longer uses therapy belugas, and Vikeby suggests making use of Hvaldimir to advertise Hammerfest.

See also
 Benny, a beluga whale that was resident in the Thames Estuary from 2018 to 2019
 Moby Dick, a beluga whale which became a sensation in Germany and the Netherlands after being sighted in the Lower Rhine in 1966
 List of individual cetaceans

References

External links
https://www.onewhale.org/
https://www.norwegianwhalereserve.org/

Individual beluga whales
History of Finnmark
Måsøy